Bollnäs Municipality (Bollnäs kommun) is a municipality in Gävleborg County, east central Sweden. Its seat is located in Bollnäs.

The municipality evolved during a series of local government reforms in the 1950s and 1970s. It consists of six original entities and has its present shape since 1977.

Geography 
Through the municipality, from north to southeast, runs the river Ljusnan. Among the localities situated at the river are Bollnäs and Arbrå. South of Bollnäs is the confluence of Ljusnan and its biggest tributary Voxnan.

Nearby the town of Bollnäs are several water areas with fish such as trout, bass and pike. The streams Ljusnan and Voxnan also offer fishing, as does the tributary lake Vågen in Bollnäs.

Localities 
Population as of 2005:

Acktjära
Annefors
Arbrå, 2,262.
Arbrå-Norra Kyrkbyn, 127.
Björtomta, 68.
Bodåker-Norrbo, 68
Bollnäs, 12,455.
Edstuga, 65
Flästa (norra delen), 52.
Flästa (södra delen), 88.
Freluga, 197.
Glössbo, 97.
Hallen, 167.
Hertsjö, 85.
Hällbo, 172.
Höle, 53.
Kilafors, 1,124.
Lottefors, 391.
Norrbyn, 79.
Orbaden, 101.
Parten-Hov, 61.
Rengsjö, 272.
Röste (del), 57.
Röste-Norrborns industriområde, 70.
Segersta, 329.
Sibo, 351.
Simeå, 77.
Söräng-Norrbo, 58.
Tomterna
Vallsta, 280.
Vik
Västra Höle, 122.
Växbo, 148.
Österböle, 105.
Östra Höle, 73.

Protected nature 

The reserves are: 
Djupsjön-Römmaberget – reserve since 1999. 86 ha large and located approximately 12 km southwest of Kilafors.
Galvån – 22 ha large and located 6 km north of Bollnäs.
Grossjöberget – reserve since 1998. 423 ha large and located approximately 20 km northeast of Bollnäs.
Hästhagsberget – reserve since 2000. 28 ha large and located approximately 13 km south-southeast of Kilafors.
Kölberget – reserve since 1980. 44 ha large and located approximately 7 km southeast of Kilafors.
Stora Bolleberget – reserve since July 11, 2006. 99 ha large and located approximately 4 km northwest of Bollnäs.

Eight areas are included in Natura 2000. Four of these are also nature reserves – Djupsjön/Römmaberget, Galvån, Grossjöberget and Hästhagsberget – and the other four are Andersvallsslåtten, Haga, Myrsjömyrorna and Tomtas.

Culture 
Västerby hembygdsby in Rengsjö shows example of hälsingegårdar, old farms built in a way typical for the province of Hälsingland. Other examples of hälsingegårdar are Gästgivars in Vallsta, Erik-Larsgården in Arbrå and Kämpens in Bollnäs.

Outside Växbo, 15 km northeast of Bollnäs, Växbo lin ("Växbo linen"), Växbo kvarn ("Växbo Mill") and Trolldalen is situated. Växbo lin is the only remaining spinnery and weavers of linen in Scandinavia. Växbo kvarn is a water mill from the 19th century (reopened in 1985) where flour is ground using old techniques. Trolldalen displays old tools from the 19th century, tools used for processing linen.

Since 1997, the workgroup Kulturarv Hälsingegårdar has been active with the goal to get 15 villages/farms in Hälsingland declared World Heritage Sites by UNESCO. The villages and farms listed demonstrates examples of the traditional architecture of Hälsingland. On the list are among others Västerby hembygdsby, Växbo kvarn and Trolldalen. In 2006, the County Administrative Board of Gävleborg County handed over the documents concerning the issue to the Swedish National Heritage Board. UNESCO has received the inquiry and will make a decision in July 2009, at the earliest.

Politics
Result of the 2010 election:
 Moderate Party 22.32%	
 Centre party 9.56%
 Liberal People's Party 5.39%	
 Christian Democrats 4.25%	
 Swedish Social Democratic Party 36.82% 	
 Left Party 	6.82%
 Green Party 5.34%
 Sweden Democrats 8.42%
 Other parties 1.07%

Transport 
The Northern main line railway (Norra Stambanan) follows to great extent Ljusnan through the municipality. Bollnäs town holds the largest train station, the only station where inter-city trains stop. The local train X-tåget, which operates the route Gävle-Ljusdal, makes additional stops at Kilafors, Arbrå and Vallsta.

Twin towns 
Bollnäs Municipality has six twin towns:
  Nykøbing Mors, Denmark, since 1948. The town is now part of Morsø Municipality
  Flekkefjord, Norway, since 1948.
  Kankaanpää, Finland, since 1950.
  Misburg-Anderten, Germany, since 1960.
  Shepton Mallet, England, since 1991.
  Ogre, Latvia, since 1992.

Notable people

 Orienteering competitor Emma Engstrand (b. December 14, 1977) was born in, and grew up in, Bollnäs.
 Anders Eriksson (b. January 9, 1975), ice hockey player, was born in, and grew up in, Bollnäs.
 Ida Gawell-Blumentahl (1868–1953), "Delsbostintan", entertainer, was born in Arbrå.
 Åke "Stan" Hasselgård (October 4, 1922 – November 23, 1948), jazz clarinetist, grew up in Bollnäs, where his grave can be found.
 Hanna Hedlund, singer and TV show host, was born in Hanebo near Kilafors on January 21, 1975.
 Lina Hedlund, singer, was born in Hanebo near Kilafors on March 28, 1978.
 C.-H. Hermansson, politician, was born in Bollnäs on December 14, 1917.
 Anna-Karin Kammerling, swimmer, grew up in Bollnäs.
 Timo K. Mukka (1944–1973), Finnish writer, was born in Bollnäs, whereto his family had been evacuated from the Finnish province of Lapland region during the Lapland War.
 Gösta "Snoddas" Nordgren, singer and bandy player, was born in Arbrå on December 30, 1926.
 Thomas von Scheele, table tennis player, was born in Bollnäs on March 13, 1969.
 Victoria Silvstedt, super model, grew up in Bollnäs.
 Peter Stormare, actor, grew up in Arbrå.
 Per-Inge Tällberg, ski jumper, was born in Bollnäs on June 14, 1967.
 Staffan Tällberg, ski jumper, was born in Bollnäs on April 17, 1970.
 Nils Molin, Dynazty and Amaranthe vocalist, was born in Kilafors on October 18th, 1988.

Notes

External links 

Bollnäs kommun – Official Website

Municipalities of Gävleborg County